Space Shuttle engine may refer to:

 AJ10, engine mounted on the Space Shuttle Orbital Maneuvering System
 RS-25, engine mounted on the Space Shuttle orbiter